Frans Kaisiepo International Airport , is an airport in Biak, Papua, Indonesia. It is also known as Mokmer Airport. The airport is named after Frans Kaisiepo (1921–1979), the fourth Governor of Papua. The airport has seven aircraft parking slots, of which two are capable of handling wide-body aircraft, and a small terminal without jet bridges. The airport's only runway is 3,571m long, designated as 11/29.

History
As World War II started in the Asia-Pacific region, Japan started occupying New Guinea in 1942. In an effort to win the war, some naval bases and military airbases were built there. This also happened in Biak, particularly at the village of Ambroben, where Mokmer Airfield was built. It had a 2,000 X 40 m runway and was built by Romusha workers.

Japan then attempted to build a second military airfield in Samao county. However, the airfield was never completed and abandoned when Allied troops attacked Japan's military and defense bases. Meanwhile, Mokmer Airfield was completed and was now capable of supporting Japan's military aircraft, either single-engine or twin-engine.

The allied troops landed at Biak on 16 November 1944. With the most complex equipment of that time, they built many military facilities, including air services for troop mobility, logistic hub, and defense base. Two other airfields were built at Biak; Burokub Airfield in Burokub Subdistrict (now used by the Indonesian Air Force as the Manuhua Air Force Base) and Sorido Airfield in the village of Samau (now used by the Indonesian Navy Air Force). Mokmer Airfield's runway was extended to 3,000 X 40 m. This airfield was used by the Royal Australian Air Force. The allied troops ended their presence in Biak in 1945.

World War II
Mokmer Airfield was part of a complex of airfields built on Biak Island by the Japanese (Mokmer, Burokub, and Sorido), of which Mokmer was the main USAAF facility after the island was taken by the United States after fierce fighting in late May and June 1944.

The Battle of Biak Island came about after a succession of Japanese defeats in 1943 and 1944 along the northern coast of New Guinea.  Biak became a Japanese stronghold, which they were determined to hold to the last man.  Unknown to the advancing Allies, the Japanese began fortifying the island  and when the Allies invaded on 27 May 1944, the Japanese put up a fierce defense.  The only tank vs. tank battle in New Guinea occurred on Biak, where Japanese Ha-Go light tanks were knocked out by American Sherman tanks. Japanese soldiers were well entrenched in the interior of the island in limestone caves and fortifications, a trend that would be seen again in islands like Palau. These entrenched troops fought an excellent defense and the casualties at Biak were high - for the American Army, 435 KIA and 2,360 WIA.  The Japanese lost an estimated 6,125 KIA, with  460 POWs, and 360 Formosan POWs.

Major Allied units stationed on Biak Island
 38th Bombardment Group		(1–15 October 1944)
 90th Bombardment Group			(10 August 1944 – 26 January 1945)
 345th Bombardment Group		(July – 12 November 1944)
 49th Fighter Group			(5 June – 24 October 1944)
 475th Fighter Group 			(14 July – 28 October 1944)
 6th Reconnaissance Group 				        (August – 3 November 1944)
 71st Reconnaissance Group	(8 August – 5 November 1944)
 91st Reconnaissance Wing 	        (10 August – 12 November 1944)
 2d Combat Cargo Group 					(November 1944 – May 1945)
 54th Troop Carrier Wing	(5 October 1944 – 14 February 1945)
 374th Troop Carrier Group		(14 October 1944 – 28 May 1945)
 375th Troop Carrier Group		(14 October 1944 – 28 May 1945)

Postwar
Postwar, the airfield complex became a major reclamation site for all types of surplus Allied aircraft.

Mokmer Airfield is located to the west of Mokmer village on Biak, parallel to the coastline and the Yapen Strait and is the only one of the three currently used as an airport and is now called Frans Kaisiepo International Airport. Mokmer Airfield also became a major refueling point for airline flights from the United States to destinations in Indonesia, prior to non-stop cross Pacific flights. On 16 July 1957, KLM Flight 844 crashed into Cenderawasih Bay shortly after takeoff. 58 out of 68 passengers on board the Lockheed 1049E Super Constellation propliner perished.

Sorido Airfield has been disused since 1962 and is located to the northwest of Mokmer, and is clearly visible on aerial photography.  After the war the airfield was used by the Dutch who had kept it as a military airfield, flying P2V Neptunes and later Hawker Hunters from the base until the withdrawal of Dutch forces in 1962.

Burokub Airfield is due west of Mokmer, along the beach. Not used as an airfield after the American liberation, it became a Fifth Air Force Air Depot area; however, the old runways are evident in aerial photography.

The government of Netherlands soon took over the airfield. After Proclamation of Indonesian Independence, commercial flights started to operate to and from Biak, using Burokub Airfield which had a 2,000 m runway. Mokmer airfield wasn't in use that time and this continued into 1951. Because of a letter from Nieuw Guinea's governor (number 38/a.2/1935,dated 17 September 1953), Burokub Airfield was closed. Since then, the government started to search for another airport site. The choice was then finalized to the former RAAF and Allied troop airbase, Mokmer Airfield.

At first phase, the airport was revamped to accommodate piston airliners such as the Douglas DC-3. This phase was completed in 1954.

With the advent of jet airliners such as the Boeing 707 and Douglas DC-8, the airport went through another modernization to start accommodating them. This modernization was completed in 1959. Sorido Airfield was closed to civilian traffic and is now used by the Indonesian Navy Air Force Division in Biak.

From August 1962 to 30 April 1963, Western Papua was administered by UNTEA. As a result, Mr. A.A. Widodo  was pointed to be the first executive manager for the airport.

In November 1962, Mokmer Airport was given over to Mr. A.A. Widodo from the government of Netherlands via a person named J.C.Smith.

On 1 May 1963, the airport was given over once again from UNTEA to the government of Indonesia. Shortly afterwards, an administration improvement regarding organization and airport operation was carried out.

During the mid 1980s and early 1990s, Garuda Indonesia airlines ran a flight from Jakarta to Los Angeles in the US, via Bali, Biak, and Honolulu; Biak was designated as a refueling stopover before flying the Trans-Pacific leg.  In 1993, Garuda flew four times a week to Honolulu and Los Angeles with their Boeing 747-200 Combi and McDonnell Douglas DC-10-30 wide body jetliners.

In 1990, the airport's management and operation was handed over to Angkasa Pura I.

In December 2017, two Tu-95 strategic bombers belonging to the Russian Air Force exercised at the airbase, prompting RAAF Base Darwin in Australia to raise its alert level.

Airlines and destinations

Passenger

Ground transportation
Taxis and civil transport cars (Angkot) can be used as public transport alongside private vehicles.

Terminals
There is a terminal with a check-in hall, a departure hall, and an arrival hall.

Terminal area: 1,367 square meters
Passenger capacity: up to 100,000 passengers per year

The terminal is equipped with numerous facilities including a mosque, public telephone boxes, Automated Teller Machines (ATM), restaurants, and souvenir shops.

See also

 USAAF in the Southwest Pacific

Notes

References
 
 Maurer, Maurer (1983). Air Force Combat Units Of World War II. Maxwell AFB, Alabama: Office of Air Force History. .

External links
 
 Frans Kaisiepo Airport at Directorate General of Civil Aviation
 
 
 

Biak Numfor Regency
Airports in Papua (province)
Airfields of the United States Army Air Forces in the South West Pacific theatre of World War II
Airfields of the United States Army Air Forces Air Transport Command in the South West Pacific Theater
World War II sites in Indonesia
Transport in Papua (province)